Leonard Darr (c. 1554–1615), a merchant by profession, was a Member (MP) of the Parliament of England for Totnes in 1601. He was previously Mayor of Totnes from 1593–4. In 1602 He retired to South Pool and died there in March 1615.

References

1550s births
1615 deaths
Members of the Parliament of England (pre-1707) for Totnes
English MPs 1601
Mayors of Totnes
16th-century merchants